Yuva Puraskar is given each year to young writers for their outstanding works in the 24 languages, since 2011.

Recipients 
Following is the list of recipients of Yuva Puraskar for their works written in Kannada. The award comprises a cash prize of Rs. 50,000 and an engraved copper plaque.

See also 

 List of Sahitya Akademi Award winners for Kannada
 List of Sahitya Akademi Translation Prize winners for Kannada

References

External links 
 Yuva Puraskar-Sahitya Akademi India - Official Website
 List of Yuva Puraskar Winners

Indian literary awards 
Awards established in 2011
2011 establishments in India